The Campbell Independent School District is a public school district based in Campbell, Texas, United States. The school has one building where the elementary kids (Pre-K to 5) are in one half and the Jh/High school (6-12) is in the other.

Academic achievement
In 2011, the school district was rated "recognized" by the Texas Education Agency.

Special programs

Athletics
Campbell High School plays football, golf, tennis, basketball, track and cross-country.

See also

List of school districts in Texas

References

External links
 

School districts in Hunt County, Texas